Eldoret South Constituency was an electoral constituency in Kenya. It was one of three constituencies in the former Uasin Gishu District, now Uasin Gishu County. The constituency was established for the 1966 elections.

Members of Parliament

Wards

References

Constituencies in Rift Valley Province
Eldoret
Uasin Gishu County
1966 establishments in Kenya
Constituencies established in 1966
Former constituencies of Kenya